Carl Sverker Åström (30 December 1915 – 26 June 2012) was a Swedish diplomat.

Youth and education
Åström was born in Uppsala, the son of John Åström, a lawyer, and his wife, Brita (née Kugelberg). His father died shortly before the Kreuger Crash in 1930.

Åström studied at Uppsala University where he received a Bachelor of Arts in 1935 and a Candidate of Law in 1939. Åström was a member of the National Student Association in Uppsala, an organization affiliated with the pro-Nazi National League of Sweden, from 1932 to 1937.

Diplomatic career
Following his studies, Åström was employed as an attaché at the Ministry for Foreign Affairs in Stockholm. From 1940 to 1943 he served at the Swedish mission to the Soviet Union, first in Moscow and then in Kuybyshev. In 1946 he became secretary of legation at the Swedish embassy in Washington, D.C. He returned to the Ministry for Foreign Affairs in 1948 and became its head of division in 1949. From 1953 to 1956 he served as councillor at the Swedish embassy in London, and from 1956 to 1963 he was head of the political division and a foreign affairs councillor at the Ministry for Foreign Affairs.

In 1964, Åström succeeded Agda Rössel as Sweden's Permanent Representative to the United Nations. He stayed on this post until 1970, when he became Sweden's chief negotiator on the EEC treaty in Brussels. Thereafter he served as Swedish State Secretary for Foreign Affairs from 1972 to 1977, and as Swedish ambassador to France from 1978 until his retirement in 1982.

Although Åström was a close friend of Olof Palme, the former Prime Minister of the Social Democratic Party, Åström was never member of, or attached to, a political party.

Later life
Åström's autobiography,  ("Moments: From Half a Century in the Duty of the Ministry for Foreign Affairs"), was published in 1992.

In 2003, at the age of 87, Åström came out as a homosexual. In an interview he has explained that his role as a diplomat made it impossible to declare himself as homosexual in public, but that his superiors and others were informed to eliminate the possibility of him being blackmailed by foreign agents.

In 2004 he received the "Gay person of the Year"-award from the Swedish gay-oriented magazine QX. In 2006 he was one of the co-hosts of the Swedish TV-series Böglobbyn ("The Gay Lobby") on Sveriges Television. However he decided to leave the series after just two episodes had been broadcast.

In 2011 Åström was awarded the congress prize from the Green Party recognizing his contributions to the global environment through the UN Environment Conference in Stockholm 1972.

He died in Stockholm in 2012.

Awards 
Åström was awarded the Illis quorum by the government of Sweden in 1995.

Bibliography
 (1992)
Michelangelo (2005)

References

1915 births
2012 deaths
People from Uppsala
Uppsala University alumni
Gay diplomats
Swedish gay men
Permanent Representatives of Sweden to the United Nations
Ambassadors of Sweden to France
Recipients of the Illis quorum
20th-century Swedish LGBT people
21st-century Swedish LGBT people